Marco Stark (born 5 January 1993) is an Austrian footballer who plays for SKU Amstetten.

Career

SKU Amstetten
On 20 December 2018, SKU Amstetten confirmed the signing of Stark on a contract until 2020.

References

Austrian footballers
Austrian Football Bundesliga players
1993 births
Living people
FK Austria Wien players
SC Austria Lustenau players
SKU Amstetten players
Association football defenders